Makidai (stylized as MAKIDAI; born 27 October 1975, in Sakae-ku, Yokohama, Kanagawa Prefecture) is a Japanese dancer, DJ, actor and television presenter. He is a former performer of Exile and member of PKCZ. He is a former member of the first generation J Soul Brothers and Rather Unique.

Makidai is represented with LDH.

Participating groups

Filmography

※ Bold roles are shown as his starring roles

TV dramas

Films

Stage

TV programmes

Advertisements

Radio

Voice acting

Music videos

Advertising

Bibliography

Books

DJ Makidai

DJ Makidai (stylized as DJ MAKIDAI) is the DJ name of the former Exile performer Makidai. He is a member of PKCZ. His record label is Rhythm Zone.

Discography

Participating works

Live

References

External links
 on Exile Official Website 
 

 Former
 on Universal Music Japan 

Japanese male dancers
Japanese DJs
Japanese television presenters
Japanese hip hop musicians
Male actors from Yokohama
1975 births
Living people
Universal Music Japan artists
LDH (company) artists